Sign language is used by at least some of the deaf population of Oman.  It is not clear if there is a single language across the country, or if it is distinct from the sign language of neighboring countries.  Authorities providing training to the police for sign translators speak only of "Arabic Sign Language".

The Royal Oman Police has provided interpreters to all units.

References

Sign language isolates
Languages of Oman
Arab sign languages